Karat-e Kalleh (also Romanized as Karāt-e Kalleh; also known as Karāt-e Kalleh-ye Bozorg) is a village in Baladeh Rural District, Khorramabad District, Tonekabon County, Mazandaran Province, Iran. At the 2006 census, its population was 215, in 64 families.

References 

Populated places in Tonekabon County